Radosh is a surname. Notable people with the surname include:

 Ronald Radosh (born 1937), American writer, professor and historian
 Daniel Radosh (born 1969), American journalist and blogger; son of Ronald Radosh